Mark Anthony McKoy (born December 10, 1961) is a Canadian retired track and field athlete. He won the gold medal in the 110 metres hurdles at the 1992 Barcelona Olympics. He also won the 60 metres hurdles title at the 1993 IAAF World Indoor Championships, and the 110 metres hurdles titles at the Commonwealth Games in 1982 and 1986. He is the World record holder for the 50 metres hurdles with 6.25 secs (1986), and the Canadian record holder in the 60 metres hurdles with 7.41 secs (1993), and the 110 metres hurdles with 13.08 secs (1993).

Athletic career
Born in Georgetown, British Guiana, Mark McKoy spent his youth in England, before moving to Canada as a teenager. He attended Clemson University in 1980, but dropped out.

McKoy came to the international athletics scene in 1982 by winning a gold medal in 110 m hurdles and silver in 4 x 100 m relay at the Commonwealth Games. In the next year McKoy finished fourth at the first World Championships and repeated this place at the 1984 Summer Olympics.

In 1986, McKoy repeated his victory in 110 m hurdles at Commonwealth Games and turned his 4x100 m relay silver to gold medal, but finished seventh at the 1987 World Championships.

McKoy finished seventh in the hurdles at the 1988 Summer Olympics in Seoul, as he hit a number of hurdles in the final. His compatriot Ben Johnson tested positive for banned substances at the Games. In protest of the rush to judgement and treatment of his friend and teammate, Mark left the Olympic games prior to competing in the 4 x 100 metre relay race. This act led to Mark's 2 year suspension from international athletics by the Canadian Olympic Committee.  Over the course of the Dubin Inquiry, McKoy testified that as a young man and under pressure from his coach, Charlie Francis, 
he briefly experimented with performance enhancing drugs.

McKoy made a comeback at the 1991 World Championships, finishing fourth again in 110 m hurdles. At the Olympic Games in Barcelona, McKoy put his fourth-place streak behind him and won the gold medal in 13.12 seconds. It was the first Canadian Olympic gold medal in track and field since Duncan McNaughton's first-place finish in the high jump competition in 1932 and at the same time, Mark McKoy became the first black Canadian to win an Olympic gold medal.  At the 1993 IAAF World Indoor Championships in Toronto he won the 60 m hurdles.

A training mate of Colin Jackson, he appeared with Jackson and Linford Christie in the workout video The S Plan: Get Fit with Christie and Jackson in 1993.

McKoy had emigrated to Austria and subsequently obtained Austrian citizenship in 1994. He spent the last years of his career competing for his adopted country and set an Austrian record of 13.14 seconds in the 110 m hurdles.

He has since returned to Toronto, where he now works as personal athletic trainer and therapist. He is an older cousin to an athlete in Guyana, Kevin Parker, who runs marathons.

Personal bests

See also
 Canadian records in track and field
 Doping cases in athletics

References

 Mark McKoy at Sporting Heroes
 Newall, Liz. "You're in great company." Clemson World. Summer 2007. pp. 10–12.

External links
 
 
 
 
 

1961 births
Living people
Austrian male hurdlers
Canadian male hurdlers
Austrian male sprinters
Canadian male sprinters
Olympic athletes of Austria
Olympic gold medalists for Canada
Olympic track and field athletes of Canada
Medalists at the 1992 Summer Olympics
Athletes (track and field) at the 1984 Summer Olympics
Athletes (track and field) at the 1988 Summer Olympics
Athletes (track and field) at the 1992 Summer Olympics
Athletes (track and field) at the 1996 Summer Olympics
Commonwealth Games gold medallists for Canada
Commonwealth Games silver medallists for Canada
Athletes (track and field) at the 1982 Commonwealth Games
Athletes (track and field) at the 1986 Commonwealth Games
Commonwealth Games medallists in athletics
Athletes (track and field) at the 1983 Pan American Games
Pan American Games track and field athletes for Canada
World Athletics Championships athletes for Canada
Black Canadian track and field athletes
Clemson Tigers men's track and field athletes
Ben Johnson doping case
Doping cases in athletics
Canadian sportspeople in doping cases
Canadian emigrants to Austria
English emigrants to Canada
Guyanese emigrants to Canada
Guyanese emigrants to England
Naturalised citizens of Austria
Naturalized citizens of Canada
Sportspeople from Georgetown, Guyana
Olympic gold medalists in athletics (track and field)
World Athletics indoor record holders
Universiade medalists in athletics (track and field)
Universiade bronze medalists for Canada
World Athletics Indoor Championships winners
Medalists at the 1983 Summer Universiade
Medallists at the 1982 Commonwealth Games
Medallists at the 1986 Commonwealth Games